Patriarch Sophronius of Constantinople may refer to:

 Sophronius I of Constantinople, ruled in 1463–1464
 Sophronius II of Constantinople, Ecumenical Patriarch in 1775–1780
 Sophronius III of Constantinople, ruled in 1863–1866